Flampouro (Greek: Φλάμπουρο) may refer to several places in Greece:

Flampouro, Florina, a village in the Florina regional unit
Flampouro, Larissa, a village in the Larissa regional unit
Flampouro, Serres, a village in the Serres regional unit